The Polish People's Party "Left" (PSL Lewica) was a political party in Poland.

History
The party was established by Jan Stapiński on 5 April 1914 as a breakaway from the Polish People's Party. In the January 1919 elections to elect the first Sejm of the Second Polish Republic it received 3.5% of the vote, winning 12 seats. However, the 1922 elections saw it reduced to two seats in the Sejm and fail to win a seat in the Senate.

On 11 May 1924 it merged with a breakaway faction of the Polish People's Party "Piast" to form the Agrarian Union. The new party merged with a faction of the Polish People's Party "Wyzwolenie" and People's Unity to form Stronnictwo Chłopskie in 1926.

References

1914 establishments in Poland
1924 disestablishments in Poland
Agrarian parties in Poland
Defunct political parties in Poland
Left-wing parties
Left
Political parties disestablished in 1924
Political parties established in 1914